132 (one hundred [and] thirty-two) is the natural number following 131 and preceding 133.

In mathematics
132 is the sixth Catalan number. It is a pronic number, the product of 11 and 12. As it has 12 divisors total, 132 is a refactorable number.

If you take the sum of all 2-digit numbers you can make from 132, you get 132: . 132 is the smallest number with this property, which is shared by 264, 396 and 35964 (see digit-reassembly number).

The exceptional outer automorphism of symmetric group S6 uniquely maps vertices to factorizations and edges to partitions in the graph factors of the complete graph K6, which yields 132 blocks in Steiner system S(5,6,12).

In other fields
132 is also:
 The year AD 132 or 132 BC
 132 AH is a year in the Islamic calendar that corresponds to 749 – 750 CE
 OGLE-TR-132 is a magnitude 15.72 star in the star fields of the constellation Carina
 132 Aethra is a M-type main belt asteroid
 Sonnet 132 by William Shakespeare
 132 is the fire emergency telephone number in Chile
 132 Street is a thoroughfare in Harlem, New York City
 The number of columns of a line printer printing in landscape mode on 14-inch paper.
 Refers to the Yo Soy 132 movement to vote in 2012 Mexican elections against PRI candidate Enrique Peña Nieto.

See also
 List of highways numbered 132
 United Nations Security Council Resolution 132
 House at 132 Baltic Circle

References

Integers